Wang Ling (王鈴; 王铃), 1917 or 1918–1994) was a Chinese historian and sinologist.  He was known for his collaboration with Joseph Needham on the history of science and technology in China.

Biography

Wang Ling was born in Nantong, China, and graduated in history from National Central University (Nanjing University), which had moved from Nanjing to Chongqing during the Sino-Japanese war.  In 1943, while working as a junior researcher at the Academia Sinica's Institute of History and Philology in Lizhuang, Wang met Needham, a British biochemist who had been sent by the Royal Society and British Government to head the Sino-British Science Cooperation Office, whose mission was to assist the universities of China.

Needham had already conceived a plan for a book on the history of Chinese scientific and technological achievement, which was generally little known and appreciated in the West at that time, and recruited Wang as his chief researcher and first collaborator on the project.  Science and Civilisation in China subsequently grew to many volumes and changed educated and popular views of China in the West; it is regarded as one of the world's pre-eminent investigations of Chinese civilisation.

From 1948 to 1958 Wang worked on the project with Needham at Cambridge University, along the way obtaining his doctorate at Trinity College, Cambridge on the history of Chinese mathematics in the Han Dynasty. In 1958 he left Cambridge to take up a position as lecturer in Chinese at Canberra University College, later the faculty of Asian studies at the Australian National University.

He was a professorial fellow at the Department of Far Eastern History in the Research School of Pacific and Asian Studies (RSPAS) at Australian National University from 1963 to 1983.  In 1992 Wang Ling returned to Nantong, where he lived until his death in June 1994.

Publications

1954. Science and Civilisation in China. Vol. 1. Introductory Orientations. Joseph Needham, with W.L. Cambridge University Press
1956. Science and Civilisation in China. Vol. 2. History of Scientific Thought. Joseph Needham, with W.L.
1959. Science and Civilisation in China. Vol. 3. Mathematics and the Sciences of the Heavens and Earth. Joseph Needham, with W.L.
1960. Heavenly Clockwork: The Great Astronomical Clocks of Medieval China. Joseph Needham, W.L. and Derek J. de Solla Price
1962. Science and Civilisation in China. Vol. 4, Part 1. Physics. Joseph Needham, with W.L. and Kenneth Robinson.
1965. Science and Civilisation in China. Vol. 4, Part 2. Mechanical Engineering. Joseph Needham, with W.L.
1970. Clerks and Craftsmen in China and the West: Lectures and Addresses on the History of Science and Technology. Joseph Needham, W.L., Lu Gwei-Djen, and Ho Ping-Yü
1971. Science and Civilisation in China. Vol. 4, Part 3. Civil Engineering and Nautics. Joseph Needham, with W.L. and Lu Gwei-Djen.
1987. Science and Civilisation in China. Vol. 5, Part 7. Military Technology: The Gunpowder Epic. Joseph Needham, with Ho Ping-Yü [Ho Peng-Yoke], Lu Gwei-djen and W.L.
1994. Science and Civilisation in China. Vol. 5, Part 6. Military Technology: Missiles and Sieges. Joseph Needham, Robin D.S. Yates, with Krzysztof Gawlikowski, Edward McEwen and W.L.

References

Winchester, Simon (2008). Bomb, Book & Compass: Joseph Needham and the Great Secrets of China, pages 92, 174, 180-195, 221. (Published in the United States of America as The Man Who Loved China: The Fantastic Story of the Eccentric Scientist Who Unlocked the Secrets of the Middle Kingdom, Harper (May 6, 2008). )
Spence, Jonathan (2008). "The Passions of Joseph Needham - Review of The Man Who Loved China: The Fantastic Story of the Eccentric Scientist Who Unlocked the Secrets of the Middle Kingdom" from The New York Review of Books, Volume 55, Issue #13, August 14, 2008.
De Crespigny, Rafe.  Obituary of Wang Ling, The Australian newspaper, August 25, 1994.
Who's Who in the World, 7th edition, 1984–1985, Marquis Who's Who.  Entry for Wang, Ling.

External links
Science and Civilisation in China
Powell's Books - Jonathan Spence's Review of The Man Who Loved China

1910s births
1994 deaths
Joseph Needham
20th-century Chinese historians
Academia Sinica
Alumni of Trinity College, Cambridge
Academic staff of the Australian National University
Chinese expatriates in Australia
Chinese sinologists
Historians of science
National Central University alumni